Anđelo Srzentić (born 25 January 1990) is a Croatian footballer who most recently played for German amateur side SV Viktoria Herxheim.

Playing career 
Srzentić began his career in 2008 with NK Zadar in the Croatian First Football League. Following his stint in the Croatian top tier he played in the Croatian Third Football League with NK Velebit, and NK Raštane. In 2012, he went overseas to Canada to play with Toronto Croatia in the Canadian Soccer League. In his debut season, he helped Croatia clinch the First Division title. He contributed a goal in a 4–0 victory over rivals the Serbian White Eagles in the semi-finals. He was featured in the CSL Championship final against Montreal Impact Academy, and won the match 1–0. 

He returned to Croatia in 2013 to play with NK Dragovoljac Poličnik in the First County Football League. The following year he played abroad in Germany to play with SV Röchling Völklingen in the Oberliga Rheinland-Pfalz/Saar. In 2015, he signed with SC Hauenstein, where on 21 August 2016 he scored a goal against Bayer Leverkusen in a 2–1 defeat in the 2016–17 DFB-Pokal. After a season with Hauenstein, he signed a contract with SV Rülzheim.

In 2021, he signed with SV Viktoria Herxheim in the Landesliga.

References 

1990 births
Living people
Sportspeople from Zadar
Association football midfielders
Croatian footballers
NK Zadar players
Toronto Croatia players
SC Hauenstein players
SV Röchling Völklingen players
Croatian Football League players
Second Football League (Croatia) players
Canadian Soccer League (1998–present) players
Oberliga (football) players
Landesliga players
Croatian expatriate footballers
Expatriate soccer players in Canada
Croatian expatriate sportspeople in Canada
Expatriate footballers in Germany
Croatian expatriate sportspeople in Germany